Bindaas is a Kannada language romantic action comedy film directed by D. Rajendra Babu and Produced by M.Chandrashekar. Puneeth Rajkumar played the male lead while Hansika Motwani played the female lead, marking her Kannada debut and only Kannada film to date. The film was released on 15 February 2008 The film was dubbed in Telugu as Pandugadu , in Hindi as Be Happy Bindaas and in Bhojpuri as Baazi. It was also reported to have been dubbed in Malayalam. The movie was remade in Bhojpuri in 2012 as Hero - the first Kannada movie to be remade in Bhojpuri.

Plot 
Bangalore City is under threat from terror attacks orchestrated by most wanted don Saleem Bhai. Karnataka State Police Department appointed ACP Vikram Rathod to nab Saleem Bhai and bring him to justice. Meanwhile, Shiva is a former pickpocketer, who is caught by the police for selling black-tickets and creating a feud at the movie theatre. He meets Vikram Rathod where Shiva ask Vikram Rathod for a job in 48 hours. Shiva sees Preeti, an artist at a mall, and falls for her. She rejects him but later softens up and falls for Shiva. 

One day Vikram Rathod ask Shiva to infiltrate Saleem Bhai's gang as an informer under the pseudonym Bindaas Shivu. Shiva infiltrates the gang and joins Saleem Bhai's trusted man D and his gang. He eliminates Saleem Bhai's gang under Vikram Rathod's orders. In a midst of shootout, Preeti sees Shiva, and mistakes him to be a gangster and breakups with him. It is revealed that Preeti is actually Vikram Rathod's daughter. He learnt that she was in love with Shiva, which enraged him. Due to political pressure to catch Saleem Bhai, Vikram Rathod formulates a plan and places Shiva as an informer to make the police department believe that he is the informer, but makes Preeti believe that he is a gangster. 

Meanwhile, After an intense shootout between D and his gang, Shiva captures Saleem Bhai and brings him to Vikram Rathod where he learns that Preeti is Vikram Rathod's daughter. Vikram Rathod holds Shiva at gunpoint, revealing his entire plan to frame him. Shiva escapes with Saleem Bhai and kidnaps Preethi who then revealed her father's treachery. D, along with his gang, free Saleem Bhai and a shootout ensues where Shiva manages to kill D and his henchmen, including Saleem Bhai. Enraged about losing his promotion to DCP. Vikram Rathod tries to shoot Shiva, but seeing Preeti makes Vikram Rathod realize his mistakes. Thus, Shiva and Preeti reunite in the end.

Cast
 Puneeth Rajkumar as Shiva aka Shivu
 Hansika Motwani as Preethi
 Nassar as ACP Vikram Rathod, Preethi's father
 Suman as Saleem Bhai
 Rahul Dev as D 
 Komal as Shiva's friend
 Vanitha Vasu
 Dattanna as Priest
 Prithviraj
 Suman Ranganathan as an item number Kallu Mama

Soundtrack

Gurukiran composed the film score and the soundtrack, lyrics for which was penned by Kaviraj and V. Nagendra Prasad. The soundtrack album consists of five tracks. It was released on 2 January 2008 in Bangalore. "Thara Thara Onthara" samples the post-chorus of the song "My Number One".

Reception 
R. G. Vijayasarathy of Rediff.com wrote that "In fact, Bindaas is clearly Puneet Raj Kumar's film all the way".

References

External links 
 
 

2000s Kannada-language films
2008 romantic comedy films
2008 action comedy films
2008 films
Indian action comedy films
Indian romantic comedy films
Indian romantic action films
Films scored by Gurukiran
Films about terrorism in India
Films shot in Bangalore
Indian gangster films
Films set in Bangalore
2000s masala films
Films shot in Switzerland
Indian police films
Kannada films remade in other languages
Fictional portrayals of the Karnataka Police
Films directed by D. Rajendra Babu
2000s romantic action films